Edgardo is an Italian-language form of the name Edgar. It may refer to:

Edgardo Abdala (born 1978), Chilean-Palestinian football midfielder
Edgardo Adinolfi (born 1974), Uruguayan football player
Edgardo Alfonzo (born 1973), former Major League Baseball infielder
Cristian Edgardo Álvarez (born 1978), Salvadoran footballer
Edgardo Andrada (born 1939), retired professional Argentine footballer
Edgardo Angara (1934–2018), politician in the Philippines
Juan Edgardo Angara (born 1972), Filipino politician and lawyer
Edgardo Arasa, former Argentine footballer
Edgardo Baldi (born 1944), former Uruguayan football player and manager
Edgardo Bauza (born 1958), retired Argentine football defender
Aquilino Edgardo Boyd de la Guardia (1921–2004), Panamanian politician, diplomatist and lawyer
Edgardo Brittes (born 1982), Argentine footballer
Edgardo Chatto (born 1960), Filipino politician
Edgardo Codesal, Uruguayan-Mexican football (soccer) referee
Edgardo Coghlan (1928–1995), artist born in Los Mochis, Sinaloa in 1928 to an Irish father and Mexican mother
Jesús Edgardo Colón, mayor of Orocovis, Puerto Rico
Edgardo Colona (1846–1904), the stage name of Edgar Chalmers, a lesser tragedian in British theatre
Edgardo Cozarinsky (born 1939), writer and filmmaker
Edgardo Díaz (born c. 1947), creator of the boy band Menudo in Panama
Edgardo Díaz (Argentine footballer) (born 1988), Argentine footballer
Edgardo Díaz (athlete) (born 1968), former pole vaulter from Puerto Rico
Edgardo Díaz (fencer) (born 1961), Puerto Rican fencer
Edgardo Donato (1897–1963), Uruguayan tango composer and orchestra leader, born in Buenos Aires, Argentina
Edgardo Enríquez (1912–1996), Chilean physician, academic and Minister of Education under the Salvador Allende government
Edgardo Leyva Escandon, Mexican national and career criminal
Edgardo Fuentes (born 1958), former Chilean professional footballer
Edgardo Fulgencio (1917–2004), Filipino former basketball player, competed in the 1948 Summer Olympics
Edgardo Rivera García, Associate Justice of the Supreme Court of Puerto Rico
Edgardo Garrido (1888–1976), Chilean writer
Alcides Ghiggia (born 1926), former Italian Uruguayan football player
Pedro Edgardo Giachino (1947–1982), Argentine Navy officer, the first serviceman killed in action in the Falklands War
Edgardo González (born 1936), Uruguayan football midfielder
Edgardo Guilbe (born 1966), retired Puerto Rican sprinter who specialized in the 200 metres
Luis Edgardo Mercado Jarrín (1919–2012), Peruvian politician, Prime Minister of Peru 1973 to 1975
Edgardo Rodríguez Juliá (born 1946), Puerto Rican essayist and novelist
Edgardo Labella (1951–2021), Filipino politician and lawyer, Mayor of Cebu City
Julián Edgardo Maidana (born 1972), Argentine footballer who plays as a central-defender
Edgardo Madinabeytia (1932–2002), Argentine football goalkeeper
Edgardo Carlos Suárez Mallagray, Salvadorian diplomat, Ambassador of El Salvador to Russia
Edgardo Massa (born 1981), former tennis player from Argentina
Edgardo di Meola (1950–2005), Argentine footballer
Edgardo Miranda-Rodriguez, American artist
Edgardo Mortara (1851–1940), Jewish boy and a Roman Catholic priest who became the center of an international controversy
Edgardo Obregón (born 1999), football prodigy
Edgardo Ocampo (1938–1999), former Filipino basketball player and head coach
Edgardo Orzuza (born 1986), Paraguayan international footballer
Edgardo Pailos (born 1967), former field hockey player from Argentina
Edgardo Parizzia (born 1935), Argentine former basketball player
Edgardo Pomini (born 1917), Argentine fencer
Edgardo Prátola (1969–2002), Argentine football (soccer) player
Edgardo Ramos (born 1960), American lawyer and judge
Edgardo Rebosio (born 1914), Italian professional football player
Edgardo M. Reyes, Filipino male novelist
Enrique Edgardo Rodriguez (born 1952), Argentina-born former international rugby union player
Edgardo Roque (born 1938), Filipino former basketball player, competed in the 1960 Summer Olympics
Edgardo Ruiz, Puerto Rican ten-pin bowler
Edgardo Santos (born 1970), Puerto Rican professional boxer
Edgardo Simón (born 1974), Argentine professional track and road bicycle racer
Edgardo Simovic (born 1975), Uruguayan soccer player
Edgardo Sogno (1915–2000), Italian diplomat, partisan and political figure
Edgardo Lami Starnuti (1887–1968), Italian lawyer and politician
Edgardo Gabriel Storni (born 1936), the Archbishop Emeritus of the Archdiocese of Santa Fe de la Vera Cruz, Argentina
Edgardo Toetti (1910–1968), Italian athlete who competed mainly in the 100 metres
Edgardo Vaghi (born 1915), Italian bobsledder who competed in the late 1930s
Edgardo José Maya Villazón (born 1951), Colombian lawyer, and former Inspector General of Colombia
Edgardo Vega Yunqué (1936–2008), Puerto Rican novelist and short-story writer, also called Ed Vega

See also
Estadio Edgardo Baltodano Briceño, multi-use stadium in Liberia, Costa Rica
Gobernador Edgardo Castello Airport (IATA: VDM, ICAO: SAVV), an airport in Río Negro Province, Argentina
Eadgar (disambiguation)
Edgar (disambiguation)
Edgard (disambiguation)

Italian names of Germanic origin